Shahrak-e Resalat (also Romanized as Shahrak-e Resālat) is a village in Aftab Rural District of Aftab District of Tehran County, Tehran province, Iran. At the 2006 National Census, its population was 10,173 in 2,429 households. The following census in 2011 counted 10,095 people in 2,818 households. The latest census in 2016 showed a population of 8,625 people in 2,627 households; it was the largest village in its rural district.

References 

Tehran County

Populated places in Tehran Province

Populated places in Tehran County